The Santos de Soledad Fútbol Club, commonly known as Santos, was a Mexican football club based in San Luis Potosí City. The club was founded in 2013, and played in the Liga Premier de Ascenso of Segunda División de México.

History  
The club was founded in 2013, at first it was planned as a reserve team of Atlético San Luis, however, finally the movement did not materialize, although, due to administrative issues the team competed under the name of Atlético San Luis B. In the 2013–14 season, the team reached the finals of the Apertura and Clausura tournaments, losing both series, one to Pioneros de Cancún and the other to Selva Cañera.

In 2014, the club bought the franchise belonging to Bravos de Nuevo Laredo, for which it was promoted to the Liga Premier de Ascenso. In addition, after this move, the team was officially called Santos de Soledad.

In 2016 the team moved to the Estadio Plan de San Luis and was unofficially named Santos de San Luis, this to try to become the main team in the region because Atlético San Luis was on hiatus during the season. In 2017 Santos de Soledad was dissolved.

Players

Current squad

References 

Association football clubs established in 2013
Football clubs in San Luis Potosí
2013 establishments in Mexico
Segunda División de México